Melodije Istre i Kvarnera (in English: Melodies of Istria and Kvarner) is a Croatian song contest, held annually in multiple towns in the Istria, Primorje-Gorski Kotar and Lika-Senj counties. It consist of a competition amongst previously unreleased songs.

The first edition of Melodije Istre i Kvarnera (then Melodije Kvarnera - Rijeka 1964), held on 22 May 1964, was broadcast by Radio Zagreb (due to the local radio station, Radio Rijeka, boycotting the festival) and it had 14 artists participating with 18 songs. Ana Štefok won the first edition with her song "Nade" receiving 557 points from the public.

Winners

Public's Choice

1960s

1970s

1980s

1990s

2000s

2010s

2020s

Critic's Choice

1990s

2020s

References

External links
 

Recurring events established in 1964
Song contests
Music festivals in Croatia
1964 establishments in Croatia
Annual events in Croatia
Music festivals established in 1964
May events